Belogradets (Bulgarian: Белоградец) is a village in north-eastern Bulgaria. It is located in the municipality of Vetrino, Varna Province.

Until 1934 the village carried the name Turk Arnautlar. As of September 2015 the village has a population of 1,242.

References

Villages in Varna Province